Grande-Terre Island is the name of the eastern-half of Guadeloupe proper, in the Lesser Antilles. It is separated from the other half of Guadeloupe island, Basse-Terre, by a narrow sea channel called Rivière Salée (in English, Salt River). Pointe de la Grande Vigie, in Grande-Terre, is the northernmost point of Guadeloupe island. To the east lies La Désirade, to the south lies Marie Galante

Despite its name, Grande-Terre (literally "Large Land" in French) is smaller than Basse-Terre Island.

Grande-Terre's indented coastline is surrounded by coral reefs and the island itself is a limestone plateau. Its surface is a series of rolling hills, white sand beaches and cliffs. The island's beaches consist of both white and black sands, as well as beaches of golden sand. Of the two islands, Grande-Terre is home to the majority of Guadeloupe's farmlands and tourist resorts.

The island has a land area of 586.68 km². At the 2006 census the population of Grande-Terre was 197,603 inhabitants living in 10 communes (municipalities). The population density was 337 inhabitants per km² (872 inh. per sq. miles). The most populated communes are, in descending order of population, Les Abymes (part of the Pointe-à-Pitre urban area), Le Gosier (part of the Pointe-à-Pitre urban area), Pointe-à-Pitre (part of the Pointe-à-Pitre urban area), Le Moule, Sainte-Anne, and Morne-à-l'Eau.

History
Historically, Grande-Terre Island was called "cibuqueira", ("Gum tree island", in the Caribbean language) and the island of Basse-Terre, "Caloucaera" (Karukera), a word meaning "the island of beautiful waters" in the Caribbean language.

References 

Islands of Guadeloupe